Michael McLintock was the chief executive of M&G Investments. It was announced in February 2016 that Anne Richards of Aberdeen Asset Management will be taking over from McLintock as chief executive of M&G.

References

British chief executives
Living people
Prudential plc
Year of birth missing (living people)
Alumni of the University of Oxford